HMS Nith was a River-class frigate of the Royal Navy during World War II. In 1948, she was transferred to the Egyptian Navy and given the name Domiat.

World War II 

During the war, the ship served in Normandy, India, the Far East, and in the Reserve Fleet at Harwich, England.

Having failed her sea trials due to lack of speed, HMS Nith was prepared as a Brigade headquarters ship for the D-Day Normandy landings, acting as the 231st Infantry Brigade HQ, delivering Brigadier Stanier Alexander Beville Gibbons Stanier to Gold Beach - Jig Green.

HMS Nith was then detailed with the task of coordinating landing ships going ashore off Courseulles, and as a result of craft not being able to identify her, the Nith had her bridge painted orange.

On being stationed offshore, a crewman from the Nith recollects seeing a German mini-sub moored to a British minesweeper aft of HMS Nith. The mini-sub still contained the dead pilot in its cockpit, with a shell hole through the mini-sub canopy clearly visible. Subsequent efforts to trace the history of this mini-sub have proved fruitless.

On the night of 23 / 24 June 1944, HMS Nith was attacked by a Mistel, a German prototype drone aircraft packed with explosives, remotely controlled by a mother aircraft that released the drone after being previously attached to it. Nine crew were instantly killed and were buried at sea, with a tenth succumbing to his wounds shortly after. This tenth casualty being buried in Hollybrook CWGC cemetery in Southampton. An American hospital ship took off the twenty six wounded and the Nith was then towed back to Whites shipyard at Cowes on the Isle of Wight for repairs.

HMS Nith was then sent to the Far East theatre, where on occasion she transported Japanese PoW's. HMS Nith took part in the Rangoon victory fleet review undertaken by Lord Mountbatten in 1945. HMS Nith can be seen in a newsreel of the review, (obtainable from IWM).

In 1948, she was transferred to the Egyptian Navy and given the name Domiat.

Sinking 

As part of the Suez Crisis, on the night of 31 October 1956 in the northern Red Sea, the British light cruiser HMS Newfoundland challenged and engaged the Egyptian frigate Domiat, reducing it to a burning hulk in a brief gun battle. The Egyptian warship was then sunk by escorting destroyer HMS Diana, with 69 surviving Egyptian sailors rescued.

References

Bibliography
 
 
 
 

1942 ships
River-class frigates of the Royal Navy
World War II frigates of the United Kingdom
Frigates of the Egyptian Navy
Shipwrecks in the Red Sea
Maritime incidents in 1956